Goniodoridella is  a genus of sea slugs, specifically dorid nudibranchs, marine gastropod molluscs in the family Goniodorididae.

Species 
Species within the genus Goniodoris include:
 Goniodoridella borealis Martynov, Sanamyan & Korshunova, 2015
 Goniodoridella savignyi Pruvot-Fol, 1933

References 

 Ekimova, Irina, et al. "Integrative systematics of northern and Arctic nudibranchs of the genus Dendronotus (Mollusca, Gastropoda), with descriptions of three new species." Zoological Journal of the Linnean Society 173.4 (2015): 841-886.

Goniodorididae
Gastropod genera